Sajjad Ganjzadeh (also Romanized as "Sajjād Ganjzādeh"; born 4 January 1992 in Tehran) is an Iranian karateka. Competing in the above 84 kg kumite division he won gold medals at the 2020 Tokyo Olympics, 2014 and 2016 world championships, 2013 and 2017 Asian championships, and 2018 Asian Games. He has also won multiple awards in competitions within the Karate1 Premier League.

He is the first Iranian karateka to win an Olympic gold medal. He won the gold medal in the men's +75 kg event after being knocked out by an illegal kick from Tareg Hamedi of Saudi Arabia. Hamedi was disqualified and Ganjzadeh won the gold medal.

Achievements

References

External links 
 
 

1992 births
Living people
Iranian male karateka
Asian Games gold medalists for Iran
Asian Games medalists in karate
Karateka at the 2014 Asian Games
Karateka at the 2018 Asian Games
Medalists at the 2018 Asian Games
World Games silver medalists
Competitors at the 2017 World Games
World Games medalists in karate
Islamic Solidarity Games medalists in karate
Islamic Solidarity Games competitors for Iran
Karateka at the 2020 Summer Olympics
Olympic karateka of Iran
Medalists at the 2020 Summer Olympics
Olympic medalists in karate
Olympic gold medalists for Iran
Sportspeople from Tehran
20th-century Iranian people
21st-century Iranian people